Michael George McDougal (born April 30, 1958) is an American former professional ice hockey forward. He played 61 games in the National Hockey League with the New York Rangers and Hartford Whalers between 1978 and 1983. The rest of his career, which lasted from 1976 to 1984, was mainly spent in the minor leagues. Internationally McDougal played for the American national team at the 1977 and 1978 World Junior Championships.

Biography
As a youth, McDougal played in the 1969 Quebec International Pee-Wee Hockey Tournament with a minor ice hockey team from Port Huron.

He was drafted 76th overall in the 1978 NHL Amateur Draft by the New York Rangers. He played three games for the Rangers and played mostly with the New Haven Nighthawks of the American Hockey League. In 1981, McDougal joined the Hartford Whalers where during the 1982-83 NHL season, he scored 8 goals and 10 assists in 55 games. He however spent the majority of his tenure in the AHL with the Binghamton Whalers and eventually retired in 1984.

Career statistics

Regular season and playoffs

International

References

External links
 

1958 births
Living people
American men's ice hockey forwards
Binghamton Whalers players
Hartford Whalers players
Ice hockey players from Michigan
Montreal Juniors players
Montreal Bleu Blanc Rouge players
New Haven Nighthawks players
New York Rangers draft picks
New York Rangers players
People from Port Huron, Michigan
Port Huron Flags (IHL) players
Sportspeople from Metro Detroit